Art criticism